Hydrophorus litoreus  is a species of fly in the family of Dolichopodidae.

References

Insects described in 1823
litoreus
Taxa named by Carl Fredrik Fallén